A Cultural Hindu is a religiously unobservant individual who identifies with Hinduism, usually due to family background.

Definition 
Emory University professor John Y. Fenton defines the locution as follows:

The term has come into vogue as a result of secularization. Cultural Hindus, while not religiously devout, may still observe Hindu festivals, such as Diwali. For these individuals, this commemoration of Hindu festivals, as well as occasional temple attendance, serve as a celebration of their heritage.

See also 

 Hindu atheism
 Cultural Christians, Christian culture
 Cultural Jews, Jewish culture
 Cultural Muslims, Islamic culture

References 

Hindu culture
Secularism in Asia